Peter Blair (February 14, 1932 – June 29, 1994) was an American sport wrestler and naval officer.  He was Olympic bronze medalist in Freestyle wrestling in 1956.

A Norfolk, Virginia native, Blair attended Granby High School graduating at age 16. He would then go on to attend the Naval Academy, graduating in 1955 and winning two NCAA crowns at 190 lbs. His greatest year was 1956 when he won the Eastern All-Navy heavyweight title, the All-Navy title at 191 lbs., the 191 lb. class at the AAU Championships, and then won the Olympic Trials. After the Olympics he retired from wrestling and became a career Naval officer. He was inducted into the National Wrestling Hall of Fame as a Distinguished Member in 2009.

References

External links

1932 births
1994 deaths
Sportspeople from Cleveland
United States Navy officers
Wrestlers at the 1956 Summer Olympics
American male sport wrestlers
Olympic bronze medalists for the United States in wrestling
Medalists at the 1956 Summer Olympics